Kronprinsessegade 38 is a listed property located at the corner of Kronprinsessegade and Dronningens Tværgade in central Copenhagen, Denmark.

History

Kronprinsessegade 4+ was built by  Bloms Enke & Sønner in 1805–1806. The mathematician and later politician C. G. Andræ (1812-1893) lived in the building from 1843 to 1846. Natalie Zahle, founder of N. Zahle's School,  lived in the building from 1852 to 1856. The painter  Vilhelm Rosenstand lived on the second floor in 1891–1892. The landowner and politician Johan Knudsen (1865-1942) had his city home in the building in around 1938.

Architecture
The building consists of four storeys over a high cellar. It has five bays towards each street as well as a chamfered, recessed corner bay.

Today

References

External links

External links
 Admiralinde de Hammilton

Listed residential buildings in Copenhagen
Residential buildings completed in 1806
1806 establishments in Denmark